Thermal is an adjective related to heat. It may specifically refer to:

 Thermal column, or just "thermal", an atmospheric convection phenomenon
 Thermal underwear, worn in extreme cold to conserve body heat
 Thermal radiation, electromagnetic radiation generated by the thermal motion of charged particles in matter
 Thermal power station, power station that produces electricity using heat
 Thermography, or thermal imaging
 Thermal relief, used in printed wiring boards
 The Thermals, indie/punk band from Portland, Oregon

Places 
 Thermal, California, small town in the United States

See also 
 Thermodynamics, or Thermal Physics
 Thermite
 Thermo (disambiguation)
 Special:Prefixindex/Therm
 Geothermal (disambiguation)